The 1947–48 Eredivisie season was the third season of the Eredivisie, the top level of ice hockey in the Netherlands. Four teams participated in the league, and H.H.IJ.C. Den Haag won the championship. Ryan Bowden was the top scorer in the season.

Regular season

External links
Nederlandse IJshockey Bond

Eredivisie (ice hockey) seasons
Neth
1947–48 in Dutch ice hockey